The Spartel or Espartel Sill is one of the sills separating the Mediterranean Sea and the Atlantic Ocean. This threshold is the second shallowest seafloor pass between the Iberian Peninsula and Africa. The deep, salty and dense waters of the Mediterranean must climb to that depth when flowing towards the Atlantic.

See also
Spartel Bank 
Saddle point

Aquatic sills
Strait of Gibraltar